Elizabeth Ruth Naomi Belville (5 March 1854 – 7 December 1943), also known as the Greenwich Time Lady, was a businesswoman from London. She, her mother Maria Elizabeth, and her father John Henry, sold people the time. This was done by setting a Belville's watch to Greenwich Mean Time, as shown by the Greenwich clock,  each day and then "selling" people the time by letting them look at the watch and adjust theirs.

History

Ruth Belville's father, John Henry Belville (1795-1856), created a service for 200 clients in 1836. Each morning, John Henry went to Greenwich Observatory, where he worked and set his watch to Greenwich Mean Time. He would then set off in his buggy and would set the clocks correctly for clients subscribed to the service.

John Henry continued this service until his death in 1856. His widow, Maria, was granted the privilege of carrying on the work as a means of livelihood and continued the business until her retirement in 1892 when she was in her eighties. Ruth Belville then took over the business. She continued the business until 1940. Belville was in her eighties when she retired. At the age of 86 she was still able to journey about twelve miles from her home and attend at the Observatory by 9 am. She died at the age of 89.

The watch used by the business was a John Arnold pocket chronometer No. 485/786, nicknamed "Arnold". It was originally made for the Duke of Sussex and had a gold case. When it was given to John Henry, he changed the case to silver because he was worried thieves might steal a gold watch. When Ruth died, the watch was left to the Worshipful Company of Clockmakers.

Competition
Belville's business came under attack from St John Wynne, a director of the Standard Time Company, which sold a telegraphic time signal service and was Belville's main competitor. Wynne made a speech at the city United Wards Club attacking Belville, claiming "that her [Belville's] methods were amusingly out of date"; he also implied that she "might have been using her femininity to gain business."

The speech was published in The Times newspaper, but the article did not mention the Standard Time Company and the fact that he was Belville's competitor. Following the publication of the comments, Belville was besieged by reporters interested in her business and also the possible scandal, which was implied by Wynne's comments. Belville managed to cope, and the resulting publicity resulted in an increase in sales. Belville said that all Wynne had managed to do was to give her free advertising.

References

Further reading

External links
 

1854 births
1943 deaths
Businesspeople from London
Time in the United Kingdom